The Helsinki Finland Temple is the 124th operating temple of the Church of Jesus Christ of Latter-day Saints (LDS Church). Unlike the church's regular meetinghouses, where weekly worship services are held and visitors are welcome, the temple is open only to church members who hold a current temple recommend.

It once served the church's largest geographical temple district, which included Finland, the Baltic states, and all of Russia. It was the final temple dedicated during the church presidency of Gordon B. Hinckley and the last dedicated by him.

History
The church's First Presidency announced on April 2, 2000 that a temple would be built near Helsinki in Espoo, Finland.

On March 29, 2003, a site dedication and groundbreaking ceremony were held in Karakallio, a district of Espoo. D. Lee Tobler, of the church's Second Quorum of the Seventy, presided at the ceremony and gave the site dedication prayer.

An open house was held September 21 to October 7, 2006 to allow the public to tour the temple prior to its dedication. The temple was dedicated on October 22, 2006 by Hinckley, after a cultural celebration was held the evening before.

In 2020, like all the church's other temples, the Helsinki Finland Temple was closed for a time in response to the coronavirus pandemic.

See also

 Comparison of temples of The Church of Jesus Christ of Latter-day Saints
 List of temples of The Church of Jesus Christ of Latter-day Saints
 List of temples of The Church of Jesus Christ of Latter-day Saints by geographic region
 Temple architecture (Latter-day Saints)

Notes

References
 
 
 
 KUTV
 Meridian
 Magazine

External links

Helsinki Finland Temple Official site
Helsinki Finland Temple at ChurchofJesusChristTemples.org

21st-century Latter Day Saint temples
Buildings and structures in Espoo
Religious buildings and structures in Finland
Religious buildings and structures completed in 2006
Temples (LDS Church) in Europe
The Church of Jesus Christ of Latter-day Saints in Finland
2006 establishments in Finland